The Egyptian Handball Federation (EHF) is the governing body of handball and beach handball in Egypt. EHF was founded in 1957, joined International Handball Federation in 1960 and African Handball Confederation in 1973. EHF is also affiliated to the Egyptian Olympic Committee. It is based in Cairo.

Competitions
 Egyptian Handball League

National teams
 Egypt men's national handball team
 Egypt men's national junior handball team
 Egypt men's national youth handball team
 Egypt women's national handball team
 Egypt women's national junior handball team
 Egypt women's national youth handball team

References

External links
Official website
Egyptian Handball Federation at IHF site

Handball
Handball in Egypt
1957 establishments in Egypt
Sports organizations established in 1957
Handball governing bodies